Theodore Walter "Tobin" Wolf, also known as Ted Wolf (July 21, 1922 – June 21, 1999), was an American writer who was known for creating the animated television series ThunderCats. He was also an inventor with several patents to his name. Wolf was born in 1922 in La Romana, Dominican Republic, and died in 1999, in Honolulu, Hawaii.

References

External links
 
 

1922 births
1999 deaths
American television writers
American male television writers
Writers from Pittsburgh
Screenwriters from Pennsylvania
20th-century American inventors
20th-century American screenwriters
20th-century American male writers